Dewlai is an administrative unit, known as Union council, of Swat District in the Khyber Pakhtunkhwa province of Pakistan.Swat District has 7 tehsils, i.e. Khwazakhela, Kabal, Bahrain, Barikot, Charbagh, Babuzai, and Matta. Each tehsil comprises a certain number of union councils. There are 65 union councils in Swat District, 56 rural and nine urban.

See also

References

External links
Khyber-Pakhtunkhwa Government website section on Lower Dir
United Nations
Hajjinfo.org Uploads
 PBS paiman.jsi.com 

Swat District
Populated places in Swat District
Union councils of Khyber Pakhtunkhwa
Union Councils of Swat District